In the Woods is a 2007 mystery novel by Tana French about a pair of Irish detectives and their investigation of the murder of a twelve-year-old girl. It is the first book in French's Dublin Murder Squad series. The novel won several awards such as the 2008 Edgar Award for Best First Novel by an American Author, the 2008 Barry Award for Best First Novel, the 2008 Macavity Award for Best First Mystery Novel, and the 2008 Anthony Award for Best First Novel. In the Woods and The Likeness, the second book of the Dublin Murder Squad series, are the inspiration for the BBC and Starz's 2019 Dublin Murders, an eight-episode series.

Plot
Twenty-two years prior to the novel's events, twelve year-old Adam and his two best friends failed to come home after playing in the familiar woods bordering their Irish housing estate. The Gardaí find Adam shivering, clawing the bark of a nearby tree, with blood in his shoes and slash marks on his back. His friends are never found. He is unable to say what happened to them. Now using his middle name, Rob, he is a detective with the Murder Squad. His amnesia holds to the present day.

The plot of the novel circles around the murder of a twelve-year-old girl, Katy Devlin, whose case Rob and his partner Cassie Maddox are assigned to investigate.  The body is found in the same woods where Rob's friends disappeared, at an archaeological dig site; and the coincidence is enough to make Rob nervous, though he insists to his partner that he is fine.

Cassie and Rob have been partners for a few years and get along famously, teasing one another and completing one another's thoughts. Cassie is one of the few people who knows the truth about Rob's past. There are many rumours that they are romantically involved, though both of them scoff at the idea, despite the fact that they live almost like a married couple, spending a lot of time at Cassie's cooking dinner for one another, drinking wine, and having Rob crash on Cassie's couch across the room.

Katy's murder takes the pair along many lines of investigation. Her death might be related to her father's protests against the new motorway meant to go straight through the dig site, or one of the students on the dig might have attacked her.  She might have been abused by her father or someone else (her mother, twin sister, or older sister) in the family.  She might have been previously poisoned over time.  Or it might be related to the disappearance of Rob's friends, as a hair clip that one of his friends was wearing that day appeared near the crime scene.

These possibilities are investigated, but the detectives come up frustratingly empty-handed at every turn.  The case messes with Rob's psyche as he tries to remember details about the two previous disappearances in case it would help.  He tries spending the night in the woods, but freaks out and calls Cassie to pick him up.  He's afraid to sleep again, thinking that he'll just have nightmares, and asks Cassie if he can sleep in her bed. They lie awake for a while. until Rob kisses Cassie, and she reciprocates.

Rob feels immensely awkward after and can't go back to their normal jokey-insult ways, but he also feels that he can't start a relationship with her.  Their partnership deteriorates just as they start to uncover new leads in the case, and they are unable to discuss the case and get along the way they used to.

Rob goes back to the dig site alone, where all the students are frantically digging before the site is shut down for the construction of the motorway.  He comes to a realisation and calls in the forensics team again, who discover the location of the murder in a shed to which only three people have the key.  After some heavy interrogation, one of the suspects confesses, though his motive is far from clear.

It becomes clearer when the suspect contends that he had been dating Katy's older sister, Rosalind.  When questioned by Cassie, Rosalind denies it and any involvement in Katy's death, but she also makes a comment that Cassie is obviously sleeping with Rob.  Cassie takes it in stride; 
but, after the interrogation, she has an idea of how to get a confession out of Rosalind: Go to her and admit sleeping with Rob and promise to keep her updated on the case if she promises not to tell.

Rosalind's psychopathic tendencies get the better of her; and, once she knows that she has Cassie in her debt, she brags about the whole thing and how she got the murderer to come up with the idea by telling him that all three girls were being sexually abused by their father, but that Katy liked it and was therefore their father's favourite.  Rosalind also told him that Katy told their father lies to make him beat them and would watch and laugh and that, if Katy were gone, then they would be happy.  She also admitted to Cassie that Katy was strong-willed and wouldn't always do as Rosalind told her, so she had poisoned her to make her sick.  After this confession, recorded on a wire, Cassie arrests her and takes her in; but, because Rosalind was a few months from turning 18 (though she had told Rob previously that she was already 18), the confession is invalid.  She is released with a smug smile.

The Murder Squad Superintendent has learned that Rob is actually Adam Ryan and transfers him to menial desk work in the General Unit.  He never returns to the Murder Squad.  Cassie starts dating another member of the squad and eventually becomes engaged.  Rob is heartbroken and calls her, but it's too late.  He goes to the dig site to see the motorway construction has begun and thinks that he'll never regain his lost memories of that night.

Reception
Thomas Gaughan of Booklist gave In the Woods a starred review and hailed it as “...a superior novel about cops, murder, memory, relationships, and modern Ireland. The characters of Ryan and Maddox, as well as a handful of others, are vividly developed... Equally striking is the picture of contemporary Ireland, booming economically and fixated on the shabbiest aspects of American popular culture. An outstanding debut and a series to watch for procedural fans."  Publishers Weekly praised author French, saying she “... expertly walks the line between police procedural and psychological thriller in her debut" and that "Ryan and Maddox are empathetic and flawed heroes, whose partnership and friendship elevate the narrative beyond a gory tale of murdered children and repressed childhood trauma."  Kirkus Reviews said of the novel, "When not lengthily bogged down in angst, a readable, non-formulaic police procedural with a twist. It's ultimately the confession of a damaged man."

Characters
 "Dublin Murder Squad" (DMS) employees :
Detective O'Kelly - Superintendent 
Rob Ryan - Narrator, 35yrs old, Education in a boarding school in England and thus carries a 'perfect BBC accent', passed out from Templemore College, rookie with some experience (2yrs as floater + 2yrs in Domestic Violence), absorbed in DMS at age 31yrs. Describes himself as 'tall, bony, rangy build, fairly good-looking in an off-beat way' with the appearance of 'A brilliant maverick loner who risks his neck fearlessly and always gets his man'.
Cassie Maddox - 33yrs old, from Templemore College as well, absorbed into the DMS at a premature age of 28yrs old after being stabbed while on an undercover assignment. Described as medium height, dark curls and a boyish, slim, square-shouldered build.
Sam O'Neill - 'stocky, cheerful, unflappable guy', influentially promoted as a member of the squad at only 27yrs of age because of his politician uncle.
Detective Quigley - "wackiest" in the squad, often described as a "cretin", who sounded like Daffy Duck with a Donegal accent.

Awards and nominations
Edgar Award for Best First Novel by an American Author, 2008
Barry Award for Best First Novel, 2008
Macavity Award for Best First Mystery Novel, 2008
Anthony Award for Best First Novel, 2008

References

External links
 Official website – US version, UK version

2007 Irish novels
Irish mystery novels
Edgar Award-winning works
Anthony Award-winning works
Macavity Award-winning works
Barry Award-winning works
Novels set in Ireland
2007 debut novels
Works by Tana French